Mian Qaleh (also Romanized as Mīān Qal‘eh) is a village in Sardasht Rural District, in the Central District of Lordegan County, Chaharmahal and Bakhtiari Province, Iran. At the 2006 census, its population was 22, in 4 families.

References 

Populated places in Lordegan County